The Piano Trio No. 1 in D minor, Op. 63, by Robert Schumann was written in 1847. It has four movements:

 Mit Energie und Leidenschaft 
 Lebhaft, doch nicht zu rasch 
 Langsam, mit inniger Empfindung
 Mit Feuer

The first piano trio (first of three works with this title plus the Fantasiestücke Op. 88 for the same forces) is in an intensely romantic style, and is the most celebrated of Schumann's trios in the modern repertoire. The opening movement begins with a surging theme that is heard in counterpoint initially between the piano's bass and the violin; the scherzo's driving dotted rhythm shares its smoothly ascending contour with the flowing trio section. The third movement features a duet between violin and cello, and moves without pause to the heroic tonic-major finale.

External links

References 

 1
1847 compositions
Compositions in D minor